Dakar is the capital and largest city of Senegal. 

Dakar may also refer to:

Dakar Region, one of the 14 regions of Senegal, which includes:
 Dakar Department
Dakar Rally
Dakar (album), an album credited to jazz musician John Coltrane 
DaKAR, a 2014 album by South African hip hop musician Kwesta
DaKAR II, a 2016 album by South African hip hop musician Kwesta
Dakar (actor) (1921–2004), a Peruvian actor
INS Dakar, an Israeli submarine
Dakar 4x4, a kit car

See also
 Daka (disambiguation)
 Dakka (disambiguation)
 Dakkar, a Somali historical town 
 Dhaka (disambiguation)
 Dhakar, a community in India
 Vivek Dhakar, an Indian politician